Neal (Neil) is a given masculine name and surname of Gaelic and Irish origin. The name is an Anglicisation of the Irish Niall which is of disputed derivation. The Irish name may be derived from words meaning "cloud", "passionate", "victory", "honour" or "champion". As a surname, Neil is traced back to Niall of the Nine Hostages who was an Irish king and eponymous ancestor of the Uí Néill and MacNeil kindred. Most authorities cite the meaning of Neal in the context of a surname as meaning champion.

Surname 
Abbie Neal (1918–2004), American country music entertainer
Adam Neal (born 1990), English rugby league player
Alice B. Neal (1828–1863), American writer
Arthur Neal (1903–1982), English footballer
Blaine Neal (born 1978), American relief pitcher in Major League Baseball
Bob Neal (Atlanta sportscaster) (born 1942), American sports broadcaster
Bob Neal (Cleveland sportscaster) (1916–1983), American sports broadcaster 
Charles Lincoln "Link" Neal (born 1978), American internet personality
Charlie Neal (1931–1996), American baseball player
Chris Neal (born 1985), English football goalkeeper
Daniel Neal (1678–1743), British historian
David Dalhoff Neal (1838–1915), American artist, father of Max Neal
Diane Neal (born 1976), American actress and political candidate
Dylan Neal (born 1969), Canadian actor
Edwin Neal (born 1945), American actor
Elise Neal (born 1966), American actress
Eric Neal (born 1924), Australian businessman
Evan Neal (born 2000), American football player
Frederick "Curly" Neal (1942–2020), American basketball player
Gary Neal (born 1984), American basketball player
Jackie Neal (1967–2005), American blues singer
James Neal (disambiguation)
Jeff Neal (born 1969), American drummer
John Neal (disambiguation)
Joseph Neal (1950–2017), American politician
Keanu Neal (born 1995), American football player
Kenny Neal (born 1957), American blues musician 
Larry Neal (1937–1981), American author 
Lorenzo Neal (born 1970), American football player
Matt Neal (born 1966), British racing driver
Max Neal (1865–1941), German playwright, son of David Dalhoff Neal
Patricia Neal (1926–2010), Academy Award-winning American actress
 Patricia Neal (known as Fannie Flagg) (born 1944), American novelist and actress
Phil Neal (born 1951), English footballer
Philip Neal, New York City Ballet principal dancer 
Raful Neal (1936–2004), American blues singer
Rajion Neal (born 1992), American football player
Richard Neal (born 1949), Democratic Representative representing Massachusetts' 2nd congressional district
Ryan Neal (born 1995), American football player
Scott Neal (born 1978), British actor
Shay Neal (born 1990), New Zealand field hockey player
Siran Neal (born 1994), American football player
Stephen Neal (born 1976), American football player
Stephen L. Neal (born 1934), former North Carolina Democrat in the U.S. House of Representatives (1975–1995).
Tom Neal (1914–1972), American actor
Ty Neal, American college baseball coach
William Neal (born 1947), English painter and graphic designer

Given name 
Neal Adams (born 1941), American comic book artist
Neal Ardley (born 1972), English footballer and manager of AFC Wimbledon
Neal Baer (born 1955), American pediatrician and television writer and producer
Neal Boortz (born 1945), American radio host
Neal Brennan (born 1973), American writer, stand-up comedian, actor, director and producer
Neal Carter (1902–1978), Canadian mountaineer
Neal Casal (1968–2019), American guitarist, singer, songwriter and photographer
Neal Cassady (1926–1968), American beatnik who was the basis for Jack Kerouac's character Dean Moriarty
Neal Marlens (born c. 1955/1956), American television producer, creator of The Wonder Years
Neal McDonough (born 1966), American actor and producer
Neal H. Moritz (born 1959), American film producer
Neal Morse (born 1960), American singer and multi-instrumentalist musician and composer
Neal Nelson, American basketball, tennis and golf coach and professor
Neal Patterson (1949–2017), American businessman
 Neal Purvis (see Neal Purvis and Robert Wade) (born 1961), British screenwriter
Neal Shapiro (born 1945), American equestrian and Olympic medalist
Neal Schon (born 1954), American rock guitarist, songwriter, and vocalist
Neal Shusterman (born 1962), American writer of young-adult fiction
Neal Stephenson (born 1959), American writer
Neal Walk (1948–2015), American basketball center
Neal Watlington (1922–2019), American Major League Baseball player

Places
Neal, Georgia, a community in the United States
Neal, Illinois, a community in the United States
Neal, Kansas, a community in the United States
Neal, Michigan, a community in the United States
Neal, West Virginia, a community in the United States

See also
Neale (disambiguation)
Neil (disambiguation)
Neill (disambiguation)
O'Neill (disambiguation)

English-language surnames